Tarantula is the fifth studio album by New Orleans-based rapper Mystikal, released on December 18, 2001 by Jive Records. The production was done by Rockwilder, Scott Storch, The Medicine Men and The Neptunes, and features artists like Juvenile, Butch Cassidy and Method Man & Redman.

The album received a positive reception from critics who found it an improvement over his previous album Let's Get Ready. It spawned two singles: "Bouncin' Back (Bumpin' Me Against the Wall)" and the title track. Tarantula debuted at number 33 on the Billboard 200 with first week sales of 153,000 copies, peaking at number 25 in 2002 and reaching number 4 on the R&B/Hip-Hop Albums chart that same year. It was later certified gold by the RIAA for selling over 500,000 copies. In 2003, Tarantula received two nominations at the 45th Annual Grammy Awards for Best Rap Album and Best Male Rap Solo Performance for "Bouncin' Back (Bumpin' Me Against the Wall)".

Critical reception

Tarantula received a generally positive reception from music critics who saw it as an improvement over Let's Get Ready in terms of production and subject matter. At Metacritic, which assigns a normalized rating out of 100 to reviews from mainstream critics, the album received an average score out of 68, based on 7 reviews.

AllMusic's Jason Birchmeier praised the album for its production complimenting Mystikal's frenetic delivery, saying that "he has recorded his second great album in a row." Despite finding filler in the album, HipHopDX writer Wise Q praised it for continuing the previous album's formula of great production and wordplay, concluding that, "On the whole, the wild haired lyricist has made a good attempt at a follow-up and although it may not be five star status, it is definitely one for the collection." Kitty Empire of NME commented on how Mystikal is able to deviate from the typical hip-hop clichés and deliver tracks that express different topics, singling out the post-9/11 track "Bouncin' Back (Bumpin' Me Against the Wall)" for providing real substance and found it "strangely compelling for a show of strength." Nathan Rabin of The A.V. Club found the album more focused and consistent than Let's Get Ready because of Mystikal's production team showing improvement, saying that "Tarantula suggests that the raspy-voiced rapper's run at the top of the charts won't abate any time soon." Vibe writer Shawn Edwards was critical of Mystikal's delivery, complimenting it for being distinctive but lacking in lyrical creativity, saying that he "has the potential to be the ringmaster, but right now he seems content just clowning around."

In 2003, the album received two nominations at the 45th Annual Grammy Awards for Best Rap Album and Best Male Rap Solo Performance for "Bouncin' Back (Bumpin' Me Against the Wall)" but lost both awards to Eminem's The Eminem Show and Nelly's "Hot in Herre", respectively. In 2011, Complex ranked the album number 43 on its list of "The 50 Worst Rap Album Fails". Complex editor Chris Yuscavage called it a let-down compared to his previous album saying, "With all eyes on the rapid-fire spitter, Mystikal seriously dropped the ball with Tarantula, his phoned-in follow-up that dropped only one year later. Even with reliable collaborators like The Neptunes, Scott Storch, and KLC, every song on the LP felt like a half-baked imitation of his previous work."

Track listing

Charts and certifications

Weekly charts

Year-end charts

Certifications

References

2001 albums
Mystikal albums
Jive Records albums
Albums produced by the Neptunes
Albums produced by Rockwilder
Albums produced by Scott Storch